Can refer to:
Znamya, an orbital space mirror
Space mirror (climate engineering)
Space Mirror Memorial, an astronaut memorial at the Kennedy Space Center